Ramblin' Man Fair was a British Classic Rock festival, held annually at Mote Park in Maidstone, England, between 2015 and 2019. The festival featured many large acts including Scorpions, ZZ Top, Black Stone Cherry, Mott the Hoople, The Cult, Whitesnake, Gregg Allman, Y&T, Extreme, Rival Sons, Europe, Saxon, Steel Panther and Kyle Gass of Tenacious D.

History

2015
This was the first edition of the festival and featured Scorpions and Gregg Allman as the headliners.

2016
This was the second edition of the festival and featured Whitesnake and Black Stone Cherry as the headliners.

2017
This was the third edition of the festival and featured Extreme and ZZ Top as the headliners.

2018
This was the fourth edition of the festival and featured Mott the Hoople and The Cult as the headliners.

2019
This was the fifth edition of the festival and will featured Foreigner and Black Stone Cherry as headliners.

2020–21 cancellations due to COVID-19
The 2020 edition of the festival was cancelled due to the COVID-19 pandemic in the United Kingdom. It was intended to be headlined by Lynyrd Skynyrd, Hawkwind, Clutch and Rival Sons.

The 2021 edition was also cancelled, citing a lack of government COVID-19 insurance scheme for music festivals.

Similar festivals 

Download Festival
Bloodstock Open Air
The Downs, Bristol
Reading and Leeds Festivals
Stonedead Festival

References

External links 
 
 
 
 
 

Heavy metal festivals in the United Kingdom
Rock festivals in England
Annual events in the United Kingdom
Music festivals in Kent
Music festivals established in 2015
2015 establishments in England